Nooa Laine (born 22 November 2002) is a Malaysian-Finnish professional footballer who plays as a midfielder for Veikkausliiga club SJK.

Early life
Laine was born in Jyväskylä, Finland, to a Finnish mother and Malaysian father, . As a result, he holds dual citizenship of Finland and Malaysia. His father, Faried Bin Baharin, is from Kampung Batu Laut, Tanjung Sepat, Selangor, Malaysia. Laine started training when he was six with a summer team in the municipality of Jyväskylä.

Club career 
Laine started playing football at his hometown club JJK Jyväskylä, where he made his debut in the second-tier Ykkönen at the age of 15 in 2018, scoring one goal in 15 appearances. In April 2019, he then moved to HJK’s reserve team Klubi 04 for the 2019 season, where he scored four goals in 23 appearances in the third-tier Kakkonen.

Laine joined the current club first division side SJK in January 2021, cited the good facility is what attracting him to the club.  He was chosen as the man of the match for the first time against IFK Mariehamn.

In July 2022, Laine scored his first European goal against Norwegian club Lillestrøm SK in the UEFA Europa Conference League second qualifying round. He became a regular starter for SJK under coach Joaquin Gómez, playing various roles and positions in midfield.

Laine signed a new contract with SJK until 2024, with an option for 2025, in February 2023. He is regarded as one of the most promising young players in Finland and one of the key players for SJK under coach Joaquin Gómez.

International career 
Laine has played for Finland U17 team.

Laine also trained with Malaysia's under-23 team in April 2022, with the goal of competing in the 2022 AFC U-23 Asian Cup. He did not, however, make it into because the citizenship documentation process was still ongoing.

On 12 September 2022, the Football Association of Malaysia denied a claim that Laine was supposed to be on the call-up list for the national squad but was canceled at the last minute. They explained that they had only contacted Laine recently to get an update on the process of documenting his status as a heritage player. He was not on the list for the central training call-up at this time because he was not scheduled to return to Malaysia until October 2022 to complete the process of obtaining documentation.

In November 2022, Laine was selected for the Finland U-21 by the new coach Mika Lehkosuo. He joined the team for a training camp and an internal match in Eerikkilä on 6-8 December.

In March 2023, Laine was called up by Malaysia’s national team head coach Kim Pan Gon for a centralized training camp in Johor Bahru ahead of two Tier 1 International Matches against Turkmenistan and Hong Kong on 23 and 28 March 2023.

Style of play 
Laine is a versatile midfielder who can play as an attacking midfielder, a central midfielder or a defensive midfielder. He is known for his technical skills, vision, passing range and work rate.

References

External links
 

2002 births
Living people
Finnish footballers
Veikkausliiga players
Kakkonen players
Klubi 04 players
Seinäjoen Jalkapallokerho players
Association football midfielders
Finnish people of Asian descent
Malaysian people of European descent
Sportspeople from Jyväskylä